U-Kei (U系 or ユーけい, eng. U-Series, U-Group or Class U）is a combat sports related term that refers to either a professional wrestling-, martial arts- and/or mixed martial arts organization, programme or a sportsman with either UWF and/or shootwrestling roots.

The U refers to Japanese professional wrestling promotion UWF, that was active from 1984 to 1986. UWF is credited in pioneer in the "shoot-style" of pro-wrestling and has acted as genesis to modern mixed martial arts, in both Japan and overseas.

During early days of shoot-style pro wrestling in Japan, the professional wrestling and/or mixed martial arts organizations that derived from the idea of UWF are collectively called "UWF-kei", or "U-kei" for short.

List groups, promotions, gyms referred to as U-Kei
 Shooto
 Pro Wrestling Fujiwara Gumi
 Union of Wrestling Forces International - better known as UWF International, U-Inter, or simply UWFi.
 Fighting Network Rings - trademarked RINGS
 Pancrase (branched from Professional Wrestling Fujiwara Gumi)
 Vale Tudo Japan (event organized by Shooto)

 Battlarts - Fighting Investigation Team Battlarts (格闘探偵団バトラーツ, Kakuto Tantei-dan Batoratsu)(branched from Professional Wrestling Fujiwara Gumi)
 Kingdom (successor to UWF International)

 C.A.C.C. Snakepit Japan (formerly U.W.F. Snakepit Japan) (successor to UWF International)
 U-FILE CAMP (successor to UWF International)
 ZST (successor to Rings)
 Real Japan Pro Wrestling (organized by former Shooto founder)
 Futen Promotion (branching from Battlarts)
 Gankopuroresu (branching from UWF International and Rings)
 HARDHIT (organizer is a fighter from Pancrase)
 Pro-Wrestling Heat-Up Co., Ltd. (branched from UWF International and Rings)
 GETTO (organizer is a former Shooto fighter)
 GLEAT (a rebirth of UWF)
 HOOKnSHOOT  (MMA promotion which originally ran Pancrase rules and later became affiliated with Shooto)

References

Combat sports
Mixed martial arts styles
Japanese professional wrestling promotions
Mixed martial arts organizations